

Events

January
7 January – A 10-year plan for NHS England is unveiled. As a result of Barnett consequentials, a proportionate share of extra funding will be transferred to the Scottish Parliament, Welsh Assembly and Northern Ireland Executive.
8 January – MPs back an amendment to the Finance Bill, by 303 to 296 votes, to limit the Treasury's powers in a no-deal Brexit scenario.
9 January – MPs back Dominic Grieve's amendment to the EU withdrawal agreement, by 308 to 297 votes, compelling the government to return to Parliament within three days if the deal is voted down the following week.
14 January – Conservative Party whip Gareth Johnson resigns, saying he cannot support the government in the forthcoming vote on Theresa May's Brexit withdrawal agreement.
15 January – The House of Commons rejects Theresa May's deal on the UK's withdrawal from the European Union by 432 votes to 202. The 230 vote margin is the largest defeat for a government motion in 100 years.
16 January – Theresa May's government survives a no confidence vote by 325 to 306.

February
13 February – At the Warsaw Summit, Jeremy Hunt seeks international support for a cease-fire in Yemen.

March
1 March – The UK Government announces it has paid out £33,000,000 to settle a dispute with Eurotunnel over the awarding of ferry contracts, which was led by Transport Secretary Chris Grayling, to cope with a no-deal Brexit.
12 March – The House of Commons rejects Theresa May's deal on the UK's withdrawal from the European Union for a second time, by 391 votes to 242.
13 March – MPs vote by 321 votes to 278 to accept an amended government motion to reject the UK leaving the European Union without a deal.
14 March – MPs vote by 412 to 202 in favour of requesting that the UK's withdrawal from the European Union be delayed beyond 29 March.
18 March – The Speaker, John Bercow, quoting a parliamentary rule dating back to 1604, declares that a third "meaningful vote" on the Brexit deal cannot proceed unless it contains substantial changes. Ministers warn of a "constitutional crisis", with just eleven days until the UK is due to leave the EU.
20 March – Prime Minister Theresa May writes a letter to EU Council President Donald Tusk, requesting a three-month extension to Article 50.
21 March – The EU agrees to delay Brexit until 22 May 2019, if MPs approve a withdrawal deal; or to 12 April if they do not.
25 March – MPs defeat the government by 329 to 302 as they vote in favour of an amendment by Oliver Letwin, giving Parliament the option to hold a series of "indicative votes" on Brexit.
26 March – The European Parliament votes by 348 to 278 in favour of the controversial Article 13 of the European Union Directive on Copyright in the Digital Single Market, which expands legal liability for websites.
27 March – 
MPs back the statutory instrument changing the Brexit date in the EU Withdrawal Act by 441 votes to 105, a majority of 336.
None of MPs' eight proposed options (indicative votes) for Brexit gains a majority following a House of Commons vote.
28 March – Lubov Chernukhin, wife of Vladimir Chernukhin, a former Russian Finance Minister, donates £50,000 to the Conservative Party. 
29 March
The recently formed Independent Group applies to become a political party with the name "Change UK – The Independent Group" and names Heidi Allen as interim leader.
MPs reject Theresa May's EU withdrawal agreement for a third time, by 344 votes to 286.
A motion of no confidence against pro-EU Conservative MP Dominic Grieve is carried by his local party, 182 votes to 131.

November
1 November – Following a report from the Oil and Gas Authority, the government calls a halt to all fracking in the UK "with immediate effect" and warns shale gas companies that it will not support future projects.
3 November – Conservative MP Ross Thomson announces he will not stand at the next election following an accusation that he sexually assaulted Labour MP Paul Sweeney.
4 November
The UK terrorism threat level is reduced from "severe" to "substantial" for the first time since 2014.
Sir Lindsay Hoyle, Member of Parliament for Chorley, is elected Speaker of the House, replacing John Bercow who stepped down after 10 years in the role.
18 female members of Parliament of the United Kingdom say they will not seek reelection due to threats and abuse.
5 November – Mothercare collapses into administration, putting 2,500 UK jobs at risk.
6 November
At 00:01, the 57th parliament is dissolved in preparation for the general election on 12 December 2019.
Extinction Rebellion wins a High Court challenge against the Metropolitan Police over a London-wide ban on protests that came into force on 14 October.
Alun Cairns resigns as Secretary of State for Wales over allegations that he was aware of the role of a former aide in the "sabotage" of a rape trial.
Labour's Tom Watson announces he will step down as an MP at the 2019 election, and vacate his post as deputy leader of Labour for personal reasons.
7 November – The Times reports that Downing Street is suspected by unnamed sources of suppressing a parliamentary report into Russian interference because it contains "embarrassing" disclosures about the Kremlin links of wealthy Russian donors to the Conservative Party.
19 November – Boris Johnson and Jeremy Corbyn appear on ITV in a head-to-head election debate. The Conservatives attract controversy as CCHQ's press office alters the brand and imagery of their Twitter profile (@CCHQPress) during the live broadcast so it appears as "factcheckUK", and posts pro-Conservative responses attacking Corbyn. Conservative Party chairman James Cleverly defends it as "calling out when the Labour Party put what they know to be complete fabrications in the public domain". The Electional Commission calls on all campaigners to act "responsibly", fact-checking body Full Fact criticises this behaviour as "inappropriate and misleading", and a spokesperson from Twitter says that they would take "decisive corrective action" if there were "further attempts to mislead people".

December
 12 December – In the general election, the Conservative Party, led by Boris Johnson, achieves a majority of 80 seats in the House of Commons, while the Labour Party, led by Jeremy Corbyn, suffers major losses resulting in their lowest proportion of seats since 1935. The Scottish National Party wins a landslide in Scotland, winning 48 of the 59 seats.
13 December – Jo Swinson resigns as Leader of the Liberal Democrats after losing her constituency seat to the Scottish National Party. Jeremy Corbyn says he will not lead Labour into a future general election.

History by issue
Note: This section is provided for issue-based overviews in narrative format, if desired.

Climate change
In April 2019, Extinction Rebellion's "International Rebellion" closed multiple London streets in protests over climate change with 1130 arrests, and in October further protests saw 1832 arrests.

In December 2019, the World Meteorological Organization released its annual climate report revealing that climate impacts are worsening. They found the global sea temperatures are rising as well as land temperatures worldwide. 2019 is the last year in a decade that is the warmest on record.

Global carbon emissions hit a record high in 2019, even though the rate of increase slowed somewhat, according to a report from Global Carbon Project.

Banking and finance
In the first half of 2019, global debt levels reached a record high of $250 trillion, led by the US and China. The IMF warned about corporate debt. The European Central Bank raised concerns as well.

EU banking
Concerns increased about the European Debt Crisis as both Greece and Italy continued to have high levels of public debt. This caused concerned about stability of the Euro. In December 2019, the EU announced that banking ministers from EU member nations had failed to reach agreement over proposed banking reforms and systemic change. The EU was concerned about high rates of debt in France, Italy and Spain. Italy objected to proposed new debt bailout rules that were proposed to be added to the European Stability Mechanism.

Foreign policy

Brexit negotiations
In March 2019, Prime Minister of the United Kingdom Theresa May  and European leaders negotiated an extension for the Parliament of the United Kingdom to ratify the Brexit withdrawal agreement. The EU position was that the negotiation of terms for withdrawal had already ended in November 2018, and that the extension was only to give the UK Parliament more time to consider the Agreement. Negotiations during 2019 have been primarily within the UK Parliament on whether to accept the Theresa May Government's negotiated settlement, to leave the EU without any agreement, or to abandon Brexit.

In July, the newly assembled Boris Johnson ministry declared intention to re-open negotiations on the withdrawal agreement, with the Irish backstop removed as a pre-condition. UK and EU negotiators met for the first time on 28 August and meetings "will continue twice a week".  Fresh proposals were released by the Johnson ministry in October, which the EU dismissed as unworkable.

The Benn Act, passed by the UK parliament in September, required the prime minister to seek a further extension in the event that by 19 October, a deal has not been reached and parliament has not given its consent to a No-deal Brexit. On 28 October 2019, the date was moved back to 2020.

World trade

US-China Trade Dispute
A trade dispute between the US and China caused economic concerns worldwide. In December 2019, various US officials said a trade deal was likely before a proposed round of new tariffs took effect on 15 December 2019. US tariffs had a negative effect on China's economy, which slowed to growth of 6%. In December 2019, new deal was announced regarding US-China trade dispute.

See also
 2019
 2019 in the United Kingdom
 2019 in politics and government
 2010s in United Kingdom political history
 2020s in United Kingdom political history

References 

 
Political timelines of the 2010s by year
Political timelines of the United Kingdom